Ecsenius bandanus, known commonly as the Banda comb-tooth, Banda clown blenny, or the Banda combtooth-blenny, is a species of combtooth blenny found in coral reefs in the western Pacific ocean.

References

External links
 

bandanus
Fish described in 1971
Taxa named by Victor G. Springer